The 1986 Cal Poly Mustangs football team represented California Polytechnic State University during the 1986 NCAA Division II football season.

Cal Poly competed in the Western Football Conference (WFC). The WFC added one new member for the 1986 season, Southern Utah. The Mustangs were led by fifth-year head coach Jim Sanderson and played home games at Mustang Stadium in San Luis Obispo, California. They finished the season with a record of five wins and five losses (5–5, 3–3 WFC). Overall, the team was outscored by its opponents 233–246 for the season.

Schedule

Notes

References

Cal Poly
Cal Poly Mustangs football seasons
Cal Poly Mustangs football